The women's 5000 meter at the 2018 KNSB Dutch Single Distance Championships took place in Heerenveen at the Thialf ice skating rink on Wednesday 29 October 2017. Although this tournament was held in 2017, it was part of the 2017–2018 speed skating season.

There were 13 participants with one withdrawal.

Title holder was Carien Kleibeuker.

Result

  WDR = Withdrew

Source:

References

Single Distance Championships
2018 Single Distance
World